Hutment Battery is an artillery battery in the British Overseas Territory of Gibraltar.

References

Publications
 Hughes, Quentin & Migos, Athanassios, 1995. Strong as the Rock of Gibraltar, Exchange Publications, Gibraltar

Batteries in Gibraltar